Epitolina collinsi, the Collins' epitolina, is a butterfly in the family Lycaenidae. It is found in Nigeria, Cameroon, the Republic of the Congo, the Central African Republic and possibly Sierra Leone. Its habitat consists of forests.

References

Butterflies described in 2000
Poritiinae